Xenimpia is a genus of moths in the family Geometridae. It was described by Warren in 1895.

Species 
Some species of this genus are:
Xenimpia albicaput D. S. Fletcher, 1956
Xenimpia angusta Prout, 1915
Xenimpia burgessi Carcasson, 1964
Xenimpia chalepa Prout, 1915
Xenimpia clenchi Viette, 1980
Xenimpia conformis (Warren, 1898)
Xenimpia crassimedia Herbulot, 1996
Xenimpia crassipecten Herbulot, 1961
Xenimpia dohertyi Herbulot, 1961
Xenimpia erosa Warren, 1895 - type species
Xenimpia flexuosa Herbulot, 1996
Xenimpia hecqi Herbulot, 1996
Xenimpia informis (C. Swinhoe, 1904)
Xenimpia kala Herbulot, 1973
Xenimpia karischi Herbulot, 1996
Xenimpia fletcheri Herbulot, 1954
Xenimpia lactesignata (Warren, 1914)
Xenimpia loile Carcasson, 1964
Xenimpia luxuriosa Herbulot, 1961
Xenimpia maculosata (Warren, 1897)
Xenimpia misogyna Carcasson, 1962
Xenimpia opala Carcasson, 1964
Xenimpia sillaria (C. Swinhoe, 1904)
Xenimpia soricina Herbulot, 1973
Xenimpia spinosivalis Herbulot, 1996
Xenimpia tetracantha Herbulot, 1973
Xenimpia transmarina Herbulot, 1961
Xenimpia trizonata (Saalmüller, 1891)
Xenimpia vastata Herbulot, 1996

References

Geometridae